Milburn Russell "Tiny" Croft (November 7, 1920 – January 22, 1977) was an American football offensive tackle in the National Football League for the Green Bay Packers 1942-1947. He played college football at Ripon College. Croft was drafted in the 20th round of the 1942 NFL Draft by the Washington Redskins.

Football career
Croft graduated from Steinmentz High School in Chicago, Illinois. He was selected to an all-star team of high school players from Chicago to travel to Arizona for a game against an all-star team of Phoenix area players. Croft then attended Ripon College. Despite his size, Croft was known as gentle on the football field. The Ripon coaches set up a boxing match with a semi-professional boxer who promptly punched Croft in the nose which angered him. This experience was seen as a turning point in his athletic career. Croft went on to be a three year starter as a linemen for the Red Hawks earning first-team All-Midwest Conference three consecutive years. He was also the team placekicker. 

After finishing his college career, Croft was drafted in the 20th round of the 1942 NFL Draft by the Washington Redskins. Croft was acquired by the Green Bay Packers during his first training camp. Croft would go on to play for the Packers for six seasons.

Personal life 
His freshman year, Croft wrote to actress Ann Sheridan to invite her to the college's prom. Sheridan wrote him back declining his invitation but sent a signed picture. He married Myra Ann Wasserburger in 1944. He was a charter member of the Green Bay Packer Alumni Club. He worked in the automobile business for 30 years and retired as a District Manager for American Motors. Croft died of a heart attack in 1977 at age 56.

References

External links 
 

1920 births
1977 deaths
American football offensive tackles
Alabama Crimson Tide football players
Ripon Red Hawks football players
Green Bay Packers players
Players of American football from Chicago